Cytochrome b561 is a protein that in humans is encoded by the CYB561 gene.

Model organisms

Model organisms have been used in the study of CYB561 function. A conditional knockout mouse line, called Cyb561tm1a(EUCOMM)Wtsi was generated as part of the International Knockout Mouse Consortium program — a high-throughput mutagenesis project to generate and distribute animal models of disease to interested scientists.

Male and female animals underwent a standardized phenotypic screen to determine the effects of deletion. Twenty three tests were carried out on mutant mice and one significant abnormality was observed: female homozygotes displayed a decreased circulating glucose level after a glucose tolerance test.

References

External links

Further reading

Genes mutated in mice